Przypkowscy Clock Museum is a clock museum in Jędrzejów, Poland. The museum is focused on sundials and optical astronomical instruments. The museum began as a clock collection of the Przypkowski family, and was made public in 1909. Since 1962 it is a state-run museum.

The museum collection is world-famous, and is considered third in the world in the terms of number and worth of items displayed, after the Chicago Planetaria and Museum of the History of Science, Oxford.

In addition to clocks, the museum also has exhibitions related to history of gastronomy and literature.

External links 
Homepage

Museums in Świętokrzyskie Voivodeship
Horological museums
Jędrzejów County
Museums established in 1909
1909 establishments in Poland